The 2018–19 Oman Quadrangular Series was a Twenty20 International (T20I) cricket tournament, that was held in Oman in February 2019. The series was played between Ireland, Scotland, the Netherlands and hosts Oman. The Ireland team became the first Full Member side to tour the country. All the matches were played at the Al Emarat Cricket Stadium in Muscat.

Ahead of the final day of matches, the Netherlands had won both of their fixtures, therefore with a win against Ireland in their final match, they would win the series. However, the Netherlands lost the game against Ireland by one wicket, with Stuart Poynter hitting a six off the last ball to win the match. Despite the win, Ireland finished behind the Netherlands in the table on net run rate. The Netherlands would win the series if Scotland failed to defeat Oman in the final match. However, Scotland went on to beat the hosts by seven wickets, to finish top of the points table on net run rate, winning the tournament.

As well as the T20I tournament, Ireland played two 20-over warm-up matches against the Oman Development XI side, losing both fixtures. Scotland also played three 50-over List A matches against Oman. In the first List A match, Scotland bowled Oman out for 24 runs, Oman's lowest List A total, and the fourth-lowest of all time. Scotland won the three-match series 2–1.

Squads

Warm-up matches

1st T20 match: Oman Development XI vs Ireland

2nd T20 match: Oman Development XI vs Ireland

Points table

Fixtures

1st T20I

2nd T20I

3rd T20I

4th T20I

5th T20I

6th T20I

List A matches

1st List A match: Oman vs Scotland

2nd List A match: Oman vs Scotland

3rd List A match: Oman vs Scotland

Notes

References

External links
 Series home at ESPN Cricinfo

Oman Quadrangular Series
Oman Quadrangular Series
Oman Quadrangular Series
Oman Quadrangular Series
International cricket competitions in 2018–19
International cricket competitions in Oman